Bulbophyllum bracteolatum is a species of orchid.

External links 

bracteolatum
Plants described in 1838